Spa Road is a street in Gloucester, England.

Spa Road may also refer to:

 Spa Road Works, Dublin, Ireland, manufacturer of trams and buses
 Spa Road railway station, Bermondsey, London, a former station
 Spa Road Junction, a railway junction in Bermondsey, London